Hasdai ben Hezekiah (Hebrew: חסדאי בן חזקיה) was the son of Hezekiah ben Solomon and thus was the ninth Karaite exilarch of the line of Anan ben David. He lived in Iraq during the eleventh and twelfth centuries. He was the father of Solomon ben Hasdai.

Karaite rabbis
Karaite exilarchs
11th-century rabbis from the Seljuk Empire
12th-century rabbis from the Seljuk Empire
Year of death unknown
Year of birth unknown
Jewish royalty